Triptonide is a chemical compound found in Tripterygium wilfordii, a plant used in traditional Chinese medicine. A 2021 trial in mice and monkeys suggested that triptonide may offer a reversible male contraceptive.

References 

Heterocyclic compounds with 7 or more rings
Epoxides
Lactones
Isopropyl compounds
Ketones
Contraception for males